Vincent Louis "Slice" Schleusner (March 3, 1908 – June 5, 1979) was an American football player. He played college football for Iowa and professional football for the Portsmouth Spartans in the National Football League (NFL).

Early years
Schleusner was born in 1908 in Garner, Iowa. He attended Garner High School.

University of Iowa
He attended the University of Iowa and played college football for the Iowa Hawkeyes from 1927 and 1928. He earned All-Big Ten honors as a junior in 1928 but was ruled ineligible due to scholastic reasons in 1929. He rejected an offer from the Chicago Bears in September 1929, hoping to have his eligibility restored.

Portsmouth Spartans
In July 1930, Schleusner signed to play professional football for the Portsmouth Spartans of the NFL. He played tackle for the 1930 Spartans as a tackle for the Spartans during the 1930 and 1931 seasons, appearing in 14 NFL games, six as a starter. In July 1931, he signed to return to the Spartans. He appeared in 11 games in 1931 but missed part of the 1931 season when his eight-month-old son died from pneumonia in October 1931.

Family and later years
Schleusner married Edith Bulichek in 1930. After retiring from football, he worked as a buyer for the Hormel Meat Company. He died in 1978 in Rock Rapids, Iowa.

References

1908 births
1979 deaths
American football tackles
Iowa Hawkeyes football players
Portsmouth Spartans players
People from Garner, Iowa
Players of American football from Iowa